The Multan Cricket Stadium is a multi-purpose stadium in Multan, Punjab, Pakistan, owned by the Pakistan Cricket Board. The stadium is located off Vehari Road, in the suburbs of Multan. It has a capacity of 35,000. It hosted its first test match in August 2001, when Pakistan faced Bangladesh in the 2001–02 Asian Test Championship.

History 
The ground was inaugurated in 2001 as a replacement for the Ibn-e-Qasim Bagh Stadium located in the heart of Multan. The first Test match at the stadium took place in August 2001 between Pakistan and Bangladesh, while the first One Day International was held on 9 September 2003 between the same teams. Floodlights were later installed to make day/night cricket matches possible. The first day/night game played at this ground was between arch-rivals India and Pakistan on 16 February 2006.

Return of international cricket

In April 2018, the Pakistan Cricket Board (PCB) announced that the venue, along with several others in the country, would get a makeover to get them ready for future international matches and fixtures in the Pakistan Super League.

This stadium hosted its first Pakistan Super League match on 26 February 2020 between Multan Sultans and Peshawar Zalmi. This stadium hosted three matches during the 2020 Pakistan Super League. It is the home ground of Mohammad Rizwan-led Multan Sultans.

On 30 May 2022, the PCB announced that Multan Cricket Stadium would host a three match ODI series against the West Indies in June. Multan hosted its first international match in 14 years, with the first ODI against the West Indies on 8 June 2022.

In August 2022, the PCB announced that Multan would serve as one of the venues for the home Test series against England in December 2022.

Enclosures 
 Javed Miandad Enclosure
 Zaheer Abbas Enclosure
 Waqar Younas Enclosure
 Inzamamul Haq Enclosure
 Fazal Mahmood Enclosure
 Imran Khan Enclosure

Records

Test 

 Highest team total: 675/5d, by  India against  Pakistan in March 2004.
 Lowest team total: 134, by  Bangladesh against  Pakistan in August 2001.

 Highest run chase achieved: 262/9,  Pakistan against  Bangladesh in September 2001.
 Highest score: 309, by  Virender Sehwag against  Pakistan in March 2004.
 Most runs: 517, in 7 innings by  Mohammad Yousuf from 2001–2006.
 Highest partnership: 336, for the 3rd wicket by  Virender Sehwag and  Sachin Tendulkar against  Pakistan in March 2004.
 Best bowling: 7/114, by  Abrar Ahmed against  England in December 2022.
 Most wickets: 22, in 5 innings by  Danish Kaneria from 2001–2006.

One Day International 

 Highest team total: 323/3, by Pakistan against  Bangladesh in September 2003.
 Lowest team total: 148, by  Zimbabwe against  Pakistan in September 2004.

 Highest run chase achieved: 306/5,  Pakistan against  West Indies in June 2022.
 Highest score: 127, by  Shai Hope against  Pakistan in June 2022.
 Most runs: 199, in 3 innings by  Imam-ul-Haq in 2022.
 Highest partnership: 159, for the 2nd wicket by  Graeme Smith and  Shaun Pollock against  Pakistan in October 2007.
 Best bowling: 4/19, by  Mohammad Nawaz against  West Indies in June 2022.
 Most wickets: 7, in 3 innings by  Mohammad Nawaz in 2022.

See also
Pakistan Cricket Board
List of Test cricket grounds
 List of stadiums in Pakistan
 List of cricket grounds in Pakistan
 List of sports venues in Karachi
 List of sports venues in Lahore
 List of sports venues in Faisalabad

References

External links
 Cricinfo profile

Cricket grounds in Pakistan
Cricket
Multi-purpose stadiums in Pakistan
Stadiums in Pakistan
Test cricket grounds in Pakistan
Cricket